The 2020 Harvest Grand Prix was IndyCar Series event scheduled October 2-3, 2020. It made up the twelfth and thirteenth rounds of the series' 2020 season. Rinus VeeKay won pole for the first race with Josef Newgarden taking victory. Will Power led every lap of from pole position to take victory in the second race.

Background 

As a result of races cancelled by the COVID-19 pandemic, the IndyCar Series announced on April 6, 2020 that a third trip to the Indianapolis Motor Speedway would be added to the 2020 season as a support race for the Intercontinental GT Challenge's Indianapolis 8 Hours. The Harvest name paid tribute to the Harvest Auto Racing Classic, the only event held outside the Month of May at the Speedway between 1911 and 1993. Following further race cancellations, on July 27, 2020, the IndyCar Series changed the weekend from a single race to a doubleheader weekend.

The Speedway opened the gates to spectators for the first time in 2020 after being behind closed doors for much of the season, with a limit of 10,000 spectators for practice day, and the three race days (including the Intercontinental GT Challenge event that was the feature).

Entrants 

A. J. Foyt Enterprises announce the signing of Sébastien Bourdais for the remainder of the 2020 season starting with the Harvest Grand Prix. Locally based Dreyer & Reinbold Racing made their third race weekend appearance with Sage Karam, making 2020 the most appearances by the team since the 2013 season.  A week before the race, Indycar's medical team declared rookie Oliver Askew as not fit to drive. Arrow McLaren SP replaced Askew with vetern Hélio Castroneves. It would be Castroneves' first open-wheel start away from Team Penske since the 1999 Marlboro 500. A day later, James Hinchcliffe was announced as taking over Andretti Autosport's #26 entry for Zach Veach.

Practice 

A single practice session was held over the weekend. The session was held October 1 at 2:15 PM ET

Race 1 – October 1-2

Qualifying
Qualifying was held the day before the race at 6:20 PM ET. As the event was doubleheader, series rules meant qualifying was a single round (instead of two rounds as normal), split into two groups.  Drivers from the group with the fastest driver having the better time started in the odd number positions, while the group whose fastest time was worse than the other group took even number positions.

Qualifying classification

Race
The first race was held October 2 at 3:30 PM ET.

Race classification

Race 2 – October 3

Qualifying
Qualifying at 10:20 AM ET.

Qualifying classification

Race
The second race of the weekend was held October 3 at 2:30 PM ET.

Race classification

References

2020 in IndyCar
2020 in sports in Indiana
September 2020 sports events in the United States